The McCloud Railway  was a class III railroad operated around Mount Shasta, California.  It began operations on July 1, 1992, when it took over operations from the McCloud River Railroad.  The MCR was incorporated on April 21, 1992.

The MCR provided both freight service as well as passenger excursion trains like the Shasta Sunset Dinner Train.

Freight traffic consisted of outbound lumber and forest products as well as diatomaceous earth. Approximately 3,000 carloads of freight (1996 estimate) were handled annually.

The MCR interchanged with the Union Pacific (formerly Southern Pacific) at Mount Shasta, California, and the BNSF (formerly the Burlington Northern, née Great Northern Railway) at Lookout, California.

During the railroad's last stand during 2009 and 2010, their only source of revenue was due to the Shasta Sunset Dinner Train. However, due to the Financial crisis of 2007-2008, the railroad shut down in January 2010, selling off the last steam locomotive, McCloud River Railroad #25, and also sold off all but two of their diesel locomotives. The railroad stayed shut down but not abandoned through the rest of the 2010s. After a management change in 2021, the railroad will reopen for railcar storage. The time for which the line will be open is unknown.

Route

The principal line ran from Mount Shasta to Bartle. At Bartle, the Burney Branch headed south. The MCR also had a  branch running from Bartle to Hambone. At Hambone the ownership changed to BNSF (Great Northern) but was operated by the McCloud River Railroad. That line extended to Lookout Junction where it connected with the Great Northern Railway mainline just north of Bieber.

History

The MCR was originally built as the McCloud River Railroad chartered on January 22, 1897, as a forest railway bringing logs to the company sawmill on the Southern Pacific Railroad at a place called Upton a few miles north of Mount Shasta. Originally, locomotives were borrowed from the Southern Pacific, but in 1902, the railroad received their first locomotive, number 1. The locomotives shifted from wood to oil fuel as the railroad extended into the forests east of McCloud in 1907. Trains brought logs to the McCloud sawmill from the east, and carried lumber from the sawmill west to the Southern Pacific.

In 1922 Pacific Gas & Electric Company (PG&E) built branches south from the McCloud main line at Bartle to build hydropower plants on the Pit River. Materials to build the Pit 1 powerhouse, the Pit 3 Dam, and the Pit 4 Dam were carried over the McCloud River Railroad to connection with the Pit River Railroad officially known as the Mount Shasta Corporation Construction Railroad. During this period, the McCloud Lumber Company, who owned the railroad, decided to build a branch north-east to access the forests there. Meanwhile, the Great Northern and Western Pacific Railroads were building a north–south mainline, with plans to meet at Lookout. The McCloud decided to continue their lumber branch to serve as an interchange with the Great Northern and Western Pacific. The connection was made at Lookout Junction in 1927, although the connection of the GN and WP was actually made 6 miles south in Bieber. However, when the Great Depression hit, McCloud was desperate for money. So, they decided to sell the line from Lookout to Hambone to the GN. The McCloud retained operating rights until the Branch was abandoned in 2003. In 1955, McCloud extended the former PG&E line south to Burney. Upon reaching Burney, McCloud operated a  railroad including trackage rights over the  Great Northern Hambone branch.

The railroad remained primarily a logging railroad with several different owners over the following years including: U.S. Plywood Corporation (1963), U.S. Plywood-Champion Papers (1969), Champion International (1972) and Itel Corporation (1977). The railroad was sold to Jeff E. and Verline Forbis (4-Rails, Inc.) on July 1, 1992. On June 28, 2005, the railroad petitioned the Surface Transportation Board to abandon most of its line. Service on all line east of the McCloud Sawmill (now abandoned) has been terminated. A small section of line between McCloud and Mount Shasta remained open briefly for excursion and dinner train service. As timber demand declined, the railroad slowly cut back although new ownership also led to its downfall. In 2009, the railroad was sold to the MidWest Pacific Rail Net & Logistics, owner of A&K Railroad Materials, among other things. The railroad is currently closed but not abandoned.

Currently, the railroad is in disrepair. Three locomotives remain in McCloud, the 36 (non-operational), the 38 (currently being restored to operation), and the 30 (non-operational, was bought back in 2008 for use with the steam locomotives). The eastern end of the railroad has been converted into The Great Shasta Rail Trail. However, BNSF started rebuilding the eastern end of the Hambone Branch for car storage. Ties and rails are waiting for placement at Lookout. The western end will also be used for car storage, with the 38 being the locomotive used. There is also talk of bringing back the ex-Shasta Sunset Dinner Cars, none of which are currently being used on the St. Maries River Railroad (one is in use on the Niles Canyon Railway).

The railroad also had regular passenger service until 1952. The railroad's bridge over Lake Britton was used in an iconic scene in the film Stand by Me and was used in Aerosmith's music video Livin' on the Edge.

Operations
The first McCloud trains were log trains bound for the mill at Upton, then McCloud. Passenger trains were first created in 1902 and went from Upton/Sission to Bartle, the current end of the line. The lumber company would lease the McCloud locomotives and base them around the mills. When the Lookout Line was built, besides the log and passenger trains, two trains would operate to each interchange daily. This schedule remained the same until 1955, when the Burney Branch was built. By this time, diesels were arriving and two were assigned on the Branch; one to bring a train from McCloud to Burney, and another to exchange loads/empties at Berry.

When the McCloud tested the ALCO Century 415, ALCo suggested that they buy three and use them on this schedule: two would run to Burney and one would switch the McCloud yard during the day, and two would go to Mt. Shasta and one to Lookout in the night, as log traffic had switched to trucks. Although the C-415 wasn't bought, the schedule was used when the SD38s were acquired. The fourth was used as a backup or extra power when needed.

When the McCloud Railway took over operations, they used virtually the same schedule, except for having one diesel pull an excursion, sometimes with the 25, and the same was true in the evening. Railroad operations slowed down in 2005, with the abandonment of the Burney Branch, but continued on. The Shasta Sunset Dinner Train was the only scheduled train on the entire line, with the occasional yard and hill job. When the Shasta Sunset was curtailed in 2009, railroad operations came to a halt and have been on and off ever since.

Rolling stock
Lima Locomotive Works built two Shay locomotives for McCloud River Railroad in February 1912. Builders numbers 2401 and 2402 wore McCloud River numbers 16 and 17 until sold in 1924 to Fruit Growers Supply Company of Susanville, California as numbers 4 and 5.

During the latter days of steam, summer trains often included a fire car behind the engine.  The fire car was a tank car filled with water topped by an automobile engine-powered pump.

Starting in 1948, the railroad began to order Baldwin diesels, mustering 8 diesels in 1964. The road used Baldwin's DRS-6-6-1500/AS-616 series due to their impressive tractive effort; far more than any comparable ALCo or EMD offering at the time. In the later 1950s, with the opening of the Burney branch, the road bought two RS12 units, one S12, and one S8.

In the 1960s, the Baldwins were almost twenty years old, and were showing their age. The road bought three secondhand units from Southern Pacific; an AS-616 and two DRS-6-6-1500s. Unit #28 was damaged in the early 1960s in a wreck, and the unit was shoved behind the shops and cannibalized for parts. The AS-616 and one DRS-6-6-1500 were painted for the road; the second DRS-6-6-1500 was cannibalized for parts without use. All Baldwins were sold in 1969 to various scrap companies and shortlines, upon the arrival of new power.

To relieve the aging Baldwin diesels, the railroad bought three EMD SD38 locomotives numbered 36–38 in April 1969 (Builder No. 34880-34882). The units were used for all duties along the line, and as traffic increased on the road, the railroad ordered a single SD38-2, built August 1974 (Builder No. 74623-1). When the property was put up for sale in 1998, Union Pacific (with their vast SD38-2 yard fleet) showed interest. UP bought the single SD38-2, leaving the other three SD38s. The SD38s soldiered on under new ownership. Ironically, the first unit ordered, 36, encountered problems and was cannibalized for parts to keep the other two SD38s running in 2005 (exactly like the Baldwin #28). All three were sold to the Dakota Southern Railroad for use on their line.

The railroad, starting in 1995, also had two ex-McCloud River Railway steam locomotives, no.s 18 and 25.  No. 18 was sold to the Virginia & Truckee Railroad in 2005.

No. 25, the steam engine which appeared in Stand By Me and also Bound for Glory, was out of service from 2001 until September 2007, when it was rebuilt for another movie deal, but that one fell through. The No. 25 was then stored in McCloud in operable condition. Both No 18 & 25 are oil burning locomotives. No. 18 made her first revenue run on the V&T on July 24, 2010.  No. 25 was sold to the Oregon Coast Scenic Railroad in March 2011 for their excursion operations out of Garibaldi, Oregon.

In 1994, McCloud Railway leased an ex-McCloud steam engine (Yreka Western #19) and had it painted as McCloud River Railroad 19. The unit was used to see if there was enough of an interest in a tourist train on the line, and was tested in April 1994. The test was a massive success; excursions would commence in the next two years.

MCR once owned 1,182 freight cars (1996 estimate). Most of these have been sold since the abandonment of freight service.

Motive power

References

Notes

External links

UPRR MCR Profile
Shasta Sunset Dinner Train operated by MCR
Railfan site of the MCR
Pictures of the MCR
McCloud River Railroad

California railroads
Mount Shasta
Heritage railroads in California
Logging railroads in the United States
Transportation in Siskiyou County, California
Tourist attractions in Siskiyou County, California
2009 disestablishments in California